Waihāhā is a village and rural community in the Taupo District and Waikato region of New Zealand's North Island.

The suburb has two marae. Waihāhā Marae and Haukapuanui meeting house is a meeting place of the Ngāti Tūwharetoa hapū of Ngāti Hā, Ngāti Tarakaiahi and Ngāti Wheoro, and the Ngāti Raukawa hapū of Ngāti Hā. Waimiha Marae and Te Ihingarangi meeting house is a meeting place of the Rereahu hapū of Ngāti Hinewhatihua, Ngāti Kahuiao, Ngāti Turakiwai and Te Ihingarangi.

Waihāhā is part of the Lake Taupo Bays statistical area.

References

Taupō District
Populated places in Waikato